Bayport was a station stop along the Montauk Branch of the Long Island Rail Road. It was located on Railroad Street between Oakwood and Snedecor Avenues in Bayport, New York, and was the easternmost station along the Montauk Branch in the Town of Islip.

History

The depot location was donated by Wilhelm Steins, who emigrated from The Principality of Waldeck to Bayport and settled much of what is now Bayport Avenue.

This depot was located on the northeastern corner of Bayport Ave and Railroad Avenue across from the then-famous Frieman Hotel. It was opened in March 1869 by the South Side Railroad of Long Island and was razed around 1903. 

Designed by Bradford Gilbert, the second depot opened on August 10, 1903, and contained a passing siding, sometimes used for freight. Additionally, it had a connection to the South Shore Traction Company trolleys, which were later replaced by Suffolk Traction Company trolleys. 

The barrel factory was closed in 1938 and replaced by a Gulf Oil Company distributor. The station closed on September 6, 1980. The station was located between Sayville and Blue Point Stations, the latter of which also closed on the same day. The structure was razed at some point; . The former station site is evidenced by the wide profile of Railroad Avenue in the station’s vicinity, which includes a median that is sometimes used as overflow parking by students of Bayport-Blue Point High School, which is located directly south of the former station site.

References

External links
Bayport Station images (Arrt's Arrchives)

Former Long Island Rail Road stations in Suffolk County, New York
Railway stations in the United States opened in 1869
Railway stations closed in 1980
1869 establishments in New York (state)
1980 disestablishments in New York (state)
Demolished railway stations in the United States